Spean Praptos (also known as Kampong Kdei Bridge ) on the road from Angkor to Phnom Penh, Cambodia, used to be the longest corbeled stone-arch bridge in the world, with more than twenty narrow arches spanning 285 ft (87m). The bridge was built in the 12th century during the reign of King Jayavarman VII. It is one of the few Khmer empire era bridges to have survived to the modern day.

Several other bridges on the same model are visible: in the Angkor site (Spean Memai), Spean Thma on the former path of the Siem Reap River between Angkor Thom and the Eastern Baray, and at several locations of the former empire.

Gallery

References

Bibliography

External links

Spean Praptos on Andy Brouwer's blog

Road bridges in Cambodia
Buildings and structures in Siem Reap province